Vierves-sur-Viroin Castle is a castle in Viroinval Belgium.

See also
List of castles in Belgium

Castles in Belgium